Victoria Jurgens is a Canadian politician, who served as the Member of the Legislative Assembly of Saskatchewan for the riding of Prince Albert Northcote from 2011 to 2016. She was elected in the 2011 election as a member of the Saskatchewan Party caucus. She was defeated in the 2016 election, by NDP candidate Nicole Rancourt.

Electoral history

2011 Saskatchewan general election

2016 Saskatchewan general election

References

Living people
Saskatchewan Party MLAs
Women MLAs in Saskatchewan
Politicians from Prince Albert, Saskatchewan
Year of birth missing (living people)
21st-century Canadian women politicians